Ole Monsen Mjelde (12 September 1865 – 7 March 1942) was a Norwegian politician of the Liberal Party who served as the Minister of Labour 1920, 1921–1923, 1924–1926, 1928–1931 and 1933–1935, and also as head Ministry of Provisioning in 1921.

References

Government ministers of Norway
1865 births
1942 deaths